Autokabalesis is a psychiatric term that refers to the choice of jumping from a raised structure or otherwise at a  significant height to the ground. Autokabalesis can be an act of suicide or due to a psychiatric disorder.

Studies
Autokabalesis was studied in 1979 by Sims & O'Brien K. A 1992 study found that many suicidal acts of autokabalesis were committed by young males who were unemployed and single. A 1988 study of 28 persons hospitalized as a result of autokabalesis showed most fallers had serious psychiatric disorders.

Examination of data from between 1990 and 1998 of suicide by autokabalesis within New York city showed the highest number of deaths were among those aged 65 and over (Abrams et al 2005).

Prevalence
Between 1987 and 1990, 39 people were treated at the University Hospital Bochum in Bochum, Germany with injuries sustained by autokabalesis.

A 1998 study (Joyce & Fleminger) reported that according to the British Office of Population Censuses and Surveys from 1990 to 1994, 4% of all deaths by suicide were accountable by autokabalesis or from jumping in front of moving objects.

Reports of cases of suicide by autokabalesis are complicated by doubt as to whether death was caused as a result of murder (homicide). Evidence for suicidal intent, according to psychological opinion is thought to be, previous suicide attempts, depression, a history of mental disorder, or current psychiatric admission, and the leaving of possessions at a cliff top.

See also
Icarus Project
Suicide bridge
Suicide by jumping from height

References

Suicide
Suicides by jumping